The Mars Automatic Pistol, also sometimes known as the Webley-Mars, was a semi-automatic pistol developed in 1900 by the Englishman Hugh Gabbet-Fairfax and distributed by the Mars Automatic Pistol Syndicate Ltd. of Birmingham. It was manufactured first by Webley & Scott and later by small gunmakers in Birmingham and London. Manufacture ceased in 1907.

The Mars Automatic Pistol is noted for being available in a variety of calibers: 8.5 mm, 9 mm and .45. These were all bottlenecked cartridges with a large charge of powder, making the .45 version the most powerful handgun in the world for a time. It used a unique long recoil rotating bolt action which ejected spent cartridges straight to the rear, and the feed mechanism is unusual in that it pulls cartridges backwards out of the magazine and then lifts them up into the breech face.

The Mars Automatic Pistol was rejected by the British War Office as a possible replacement for the Webley and Webley & Scott revolvers, then in service with the British Army, because of the unacceptably powerful recoil, considerable muzzle flash, and mechanical complexity. The captain in charge of tests of the Mars at the Naval Gunnery School in 1902 observed, "No one who fired once with the pistol wished to shoot it again". Shooting the Mars pistol was described as "singularly unpleasant and alarming". It has since become a collectors' item because of its rarity and as an example of the earliest developments in semi-automatic pistols.

In popular culture

The Mars is obtainable in the 2015 video game, Assassin's Creed: Syndicate despite the game being set in 1868, 32 years before the firearm was produced. However, the gun is shown once again in a historically-accurate manner in the game's World War I section, where it is wielded by the protagonist Jacob Frye's granddaughter, Lydia Frye.

The Mars Automatic Pistol can also be used by the Scout class in the 2016 video game, Battlefield 1.

The Mars is described in Brian Catling's 2012 novel, The Vorrh.

Notes
 filed on Oct 15, 1900
Only around 80 pistols were made between 1897 and 1905. (Standard Catalog of Firearms)
An example of the Mars can be seen at the Royal Armouries Museum in Leeds
A near-perfect Gabbet-Fairfax Mars sold at auction in 2002 for $35,250. 
On December 16, 1996, the Mars was cited as an example of a heritage arm during a debate in the House of Lords on gun control following Dunblane.

References

External links
 

19th-century semi-automatic pistols
Semi-automatic pistols of the United Kingdom
Trial and research firearms of the United Kingdom
Victorian-era weapons of the United Kingdom